Makoshyne is an urban-type settlement in Koriukivka Raion, Chernihiv Oblast, Ukraine. It belongs to Mena urban hromada, one of the hromadas of Ukraine. Population: 

Makoshyne is located on the right bank of the Desna.

Until 18 July 2020, Makoshyne belonged to Mena Raion. The raion was abolished in July 2020 as part of the administrative reform of Ukraine, which reduced the number of raions of Chernihiv Oblast to five. The area of Mena Raion was split between Chernihiv and Koriukivka Raions, with Makoshyne being transferred to Chernihiv Raion.

Economy

Transportation
Makoshyne is connected by road with Mena, where it has access to Highway H27, connecting Chernihiv and Novhorod-Siverskyi. There is no road bridge over the Desna, and thus no roads in the southern direction from Makoshyne.

There is a railway station on the railway connecting Bakhmach with Mena, Snovsk, and Gomel.

References

Urban-type settlements in Koriukivka Raion